Sinéad Lynch (born 30 September 1976; née Jennings; in Letterkenny, County Donegal) is an Irish rower. She is a member of St Michael's Rowing Club. In August 2015 she was a member of the lightweight women's double scull which qualified the boat for the Rio Olympics. Lynch and her rowing partner Claire Lambe reached the finals at the Women's lightweight double sculls, but did not win a medal.

Personal life 
The daughter of Garda Michael Jennings (a native of the West of Ireland) and his wife Theresa, Sinéad was raised at Hawthorn Heights in Letterkenny. Her sister is Caitriona Jennings. She studied Pharmacy at university in Edinburgh and later competed Medical studies at the University of Limerick. Jennings is married to Sam Lynch, who rowed for Ireland at the 1996 and 2004 Olympics.

References

External links 
Official twitter page

1976 births
Living people
Irish female rowers
Sportspeople from County Donegal
World Rowing Championships medalists for Ireland
Olympic rowers of Ireland
Rowers at the 2016 Summer Olympics
People from Letterkenny